This is a list of multi-genre conventions. These cons typically do not cater to one particular genre (i.e., anime, science fiction, furry fandom, etc.), but instead cover the gamut of these pop culture phenomena without specifying itself as a specific convention of that variety. Many of these conventions were at one time specialized conventions, but have since spread out into multiple genres. Examples of this are San Diego Comic-Con and Animation On Display.

The list is divided up by location, and each convention includes dates during which it is typically held in parentheses.  The dates listed are approximate or traditional time periods for each convention; for more details, please see the article or website of the individual convention(s) concerned.

Africa

Egypt
 EgyCon, annual fan convention held in Cairo, Egypt since 2014.

Asia

Western Asia (Middle East)

Bahrain
AFK (at Media Center, Bahrain International Circuit, biennial)

East Asia

China
China Digital Entertainment Expo & Conference (in Shanghai)

Hong Kong
Animation-Comic-Game Hong Kong (in Hong Kong Convention and Exhibition Centre, in August)

Southeast Asia

Philippines
Asia Pop Comic Convention (in Manila, Philippines)

Singapore
EOY (in Singapore, in December)

Europe

Belgium
FACTS or F.A.C.T.S in Ghent, Belgium

Czech Republic
Festival fantazie (in Chotěboř in July)

Italy 
Lucca Comics & Games (in Lucca in late October, early November)
Mantua Comics & Games (in Mantua at the beginning of March)
Romics (in Rome, Spring edition in April, Autumn edition in October)

Poland
Pyrkon (in Poznań, in March)
Polcon (different city each year, last weekend of August)

Romania
East European Comic Con (in Bucharest, in 9–11 May 2014)

Russia
Comic-Con Russia (in Moscow, in October)

United Kingdom
Comic Con Liverpool in Liverpool, in March
Comic Con Scotland in Edinburgh, Scotland in October
London Super Comic Convention in London, in March
London Film and Comic Con (in London, in July)
MCM London Comic Con (in London, in May and October)

North America

Canada
Calgary Expo (in Calgary in April)
Central Canada Comic Con (in Winnipeg in late October or early November)
ConBravo! (in Hamilton in late July)
Fan Expo Canada (in Toronto in August)
Hal-Con (in Halifax in November)
Montreal Comiccon (in Montreal in September)
Pure Speculation (in Edmonton in November)
Sci-Fi on the Rock (in St. John's in April)
Toronto Comicon (in Toronto in March)
VCON (in Vancouver in early October)

United States
Arranged by regional divisions used by the United States Census Bureau:

Northeast

New England
Connecticut, New Hampshire, Maine, Massachusetts, Rhode Island, and Vermont
CarnageCon (in Killington, Vermont in November)
ConnectiCon (in Hartford, Connecticut in July)
Fan Expo Boston (in Boston, Massachusetts in August)

Middle Atlantic
New Jersey, New York, and Pennsylvania
Flame Con (in New York City, New York in August)
Genericon (in Troy, New York in March)
New York Comic Con (in New York City, New York in October)
Sci-Fi Valley Con (in Altoona, Pennsylvania in June)
Thy Geekdom Con (in Oaks, Pennsylvania in May)
Zenkaikon (in Lancaster, Pennsylvania in March/April)
Happy Valley Comic Con (in State College, Pa) 3rd weekend in February

Midwest

East North Central
Illinois, Indiana, Ohio, Michigan, Minnesota, and Wisconsin
Archon (in Collinsville, Illinois in October)
ConCoction (convention) (in Cleveland, Ohio in March)
Chicago Comic & Entertainment Expo (in Chicago, Illinois in April)
Geek.Kon (in Madison, Wisconsin in October)
Indy PopCon (in Indianapolis, Indiana in June)
Motor City Comic Con (in Novi, Michigan in May)
Wizard World Chicago (in Rosemont, Illinois in August)

West North Central
Iowa, Kansas, Minnesota, Missouri, Nebraska, North Dakota, and South Dakota
CONvergence (in Minneapolis, Minnesota in July)
Planet Comicon Kansas City (in Kansas City, Missouri in March or April)

South

South Atlantic
Delaware, District of Columbia, Florida, Georgia, Maryland, North Carolina, South Carolina, Virginia, and West Virginia
Blerdcon (in Arlington, Virginia in July)
Dragon Con (in Atlanta, Georgia in September)
Florida Supercon (in Greater Miami/Fort Lauderdale, Florida in July)
HeroesCon (in Charlotte, North Carolina in June)
Holiday Matsuri (in Orlando, Florida in December)
JordanCon (in Atlanta, Georgia in April)
MegaCon (in Orlando, Florida in May)
MomoCon (in Atlanta, Georgia in May)
MystiCon (in Roanoke, Virginia in February)
Pensacon (in Pensacola, Florida in February)
Spooky Empire (in Florida in the spring and autumn)

East South Central
Alabama, Kentucky, Mississippi, and Tennessee
Chattacon (in Chattanooga, Tennessee in January)
CoastCon (in Biloxi, Mississippi in early March)
ConGlomeration (in Louisville, Kentucky in April)
MidSouthCon (in Memphis, Tennessee in March
MOBICON (in Mobile, Alabama in May)

West South Central
Arkansas, Louisiana, Oklahoma, and Texas
AggieCon (in College Station, Texas in March)
Alamo City Comic Con (in San Antonio, Texas in October)
All-Con (in Dallas, Texas in March)
ApolloCon (in Houston, Texas in June)
Comicpalooza (in Houston, Texas over Memorial Day weekend in late May)
Fan Expo Dallas (in Dallas, Texas in May)
RealmsCon (in Corpus Christi, Texas in October)

West

Mountain
Arizona, Colorado, Idaho, Montana, Nevada, New Mexico, Utah, and Wyoming
ClexaCon (in Las Vegas, Nevada in April)
Denver Comic Con (in Denver, Colorado in June)
FanX (in Salt Lake City, Utah in September)
Phoenix Fan Fusion (in Phoenix, Arizona in May)

Pacific
Alaska, California, Hawaii, Oregon, and Washington
Comic-Con International (in San Diego, California in July)
Emerald City Comic Con (in Seattle, Washington in March)
L.A. Comic Con (in Los Angeles, California in October)
Pacific Media Expo (in Los Angeles, California in November)
Rose City Comic Con (in Portland, Oregon in September)
Silicon Valley Comic Con (in San Jose, California in March)
SpoCon (in Spokane, Washington in August)
VidCon (in Southern California in June/July)
WonderCon (in Los Angeles, California in April)

Mexico
Convencion de Juegos de Mesa y Comics (in Monterrey in March & November)

Oceania

Australia
There are two main multigenre conventions in Australia, both of which run shows in multiple cities under the same name:
Armageddon Expo (in Sydney and Melbourne, at least)
Supanova Pop Culture Expo (in Brisbane, Sydney, Perth and Melbourne)
Oz Comic Con(in Brisbane, Sydney, Perth and Melbourne)

New Zealand
Armageddon Expo
Overload Comic and Manga Convention

South America

Brazil
Comic Con Experience (in São Paulo, São Paulo in December)

Uruguay
Continuará... (in Uruguay, in November)

See also
List of anime conventions
List of comic book conventions
List of furry conventions
List of gaming conventions
List of science fiction conventions
List of Worldcons

Notes

References

Conventions